Karugutu is a settlement in Kenya's Nyandarua County.

Location
The geographical coordinates of Karugutu, Kenya are 0°20'44.0"S, 36°20'04.0"E (Latitude:-0.345556; Longitude:36.334444).

Overview
The village is in a remote location of Nyandarua County, with a population that is of modest means. The community is water challenged and Water Charity, a California-based 501(c)(3) non-profit was in the process of digging a borehole for the community.

Population
In 2018, the population of Karugutu, Kenya, was estimated at 300 households, with a total population of 2,200.

References

Populated places in Kenya
Nyandarua County